Someone Special was the official U.S. Navy recruiting film for the U.S. Navy SEALs during the Vietnam War era. This film was shown to all U.S. Navy recruits during their recruit training, and it was designed to motivate young sailors to volunteer for SEAL training.

Details
The film covers the following topics:
 War Games Demonstration: What S.E.A.L.s do and how they do it
 How to become a S.E.A.L.
 Overview of Basic Underwater Demolition Team/SEAL Training (BUD/S)
 BUD/S: First Phase (Physical Training): PT exercises, beach running, obstacle course training, long distance swimming, surf passage and rock portage, hydrographic reconnaissance, log PT
 Hell Week: Bringing each man as close as possible to his physical and mental breaking point
 BUD/S: Second Phase (Land Warfare): Demolition techniques, rappelling, small unit tactics, live fire exercises at San Clemente Island, UDT cast and recovery training, beach clearing with live demolitions
 BUD/S: Third Phase (Diving Phase): SCUBA training, ocean compass navigation, mock attacks on ships, submarine lock-in & lock-out training
 BUD/S Graduation
 Life in The Teams: Mark XV underwater breathing apparatus training, SEAL Delivery Vehicle (SDV) training, US Army Airborne training, High Altitude Low Opening (HALO/HAHO]) training, rock climbing, arctic training, desert training, jungle training

External links
 Someone Special - Official Vietnam-era U.S. Navy SEALs Recruiting Film

United States Navy SEALs
United States Naval Special Warfare Command
Films about the United States Navy